Brian Henson (born November 3, 1963) is an American puppeteer, director, producer, and the chairman of The Jim Henson Company. He is the son of puppeteers Jim and Jane Henson.

Early life 
Henson was born on November 3, 1963, in New York City, is the third child of Jane Henson (née Nebel; 1934–2013) and Jim Henson (1936–1990). He has four siblings: Lisa (born 1960), Cheryl (born 1961), John (1965–2014), and Heather Henson (born 1970).

As a child, he made several cameo appearances in some of the filmed segments his father produced for the PBS children's series Sesame Street, most notably in various segments of the "Number Song Series."

As a teenager, he built the first Muppet penguin puppet for the opening "Lullaby of Broadway" segment of a season three episode of The Muppet Show. During his summer break from high school in 1980 at the age of 17, he assisted in the bicycle sequence in The Great Muppet Caper (1981); he helped create and operate a special rigging device that allowed the Muppets to ride bicycles since he was skilled in the use of marionette puppets. A few years later, after doing the marionette work in The Muppets Take Manhattan (1984) in the scene where rats cook food in a diner, he became the puppeteer who worked out complicated effects.

Career

Film 
During the 1980s, Henson performed Jack Pumpkinhead in Return to Oz (1985), operated special effects for Santa Claus: The Movie (1985), and was a principal performer for the Audrey II puppet in Little Shop of Horrors (1986), controlling mouth movement while others performed the lips and vines. In addition, he also performed the voice of Hoggle, one of the main characters in his father's film Labyrinth (1986), and the Dog in both versions of The Storyteller (1988 and 1990).

In 1992, Henson directed The Muppet Christmas Carol and directed the next film in the franchise, Muppet Treasure Island, in 1996.  He performed the role of Dr. Phil van Neuter, the Muppet mad scientist in Muppets from Space (1999). In 2018, he directed and produced The Happytime Murders, a puppet crime-comedy film for adult audiences.

Television 
Henson was the executive producer for several television series: Dinosaurs (1991–94), Aliens in the Family (1996), Bear in the Big Blue House (1997–2006), and Farscape (1999–2003).  In addition to an executive producer's role, Henson played himself as the head judge on the 2014 reality TV show Jim Henson's Creature Shop Challenge.  He performed the roles of Janice and Scooter in the 2002 TV movie It's a Very Merry Muppet Christmas Movie.

Henson returned to perform Sal Minella, a character he created for Muppets Tonight, in Muppets Haunted Mansion (2021).

Other ventures 
Henson is the co-creator, producer, and currently a performer in the adult-themed puppet-based variety show Puppet Up!, and played various characters from that variety show on the British program That Puppet Game Show.

For The Muppet Show Live in 2001 he performed his own Muppet characters and one of his father's characters, The Muppet Newsman, for the first time.  He reprised the role for the 2003 video game "Muppets Party Cruise".

Personal life 

Henson married Ellis Flyte, costume designer for the 1986 fantasy adventure film Labyrinth, in November 1990. They divorced in 2002. Since 2010, Henson has been married to actress Mia Sara. They have one child, a daughter born in 2005.

Filmography

Film

Television

Video games

Awards and nominations

References

External links 

 YouTube Interview

1963 births
American puppeteers
American film producers
American film directors
American television directors
Artists from New York City
Farscape
Henson family (show business)
Jim Henson
Living people
Muppet performers
Primetime Emmy Award winners
Television producers from New York City
The Jim Henson Company people